The War Resisters League (WRL) is the oldest secular pacifist organization in the United States.

History
Founded in 1923 by men and women who had opposed World War I, it is a section of the London-based War Resisters' International. It continues to be one of the leading radical voices in the anti-war movement.

Many of the organization's founders had been jailed during World War I for refusing military service.  From the Fellowship of Reconciliation many Jews, suffragists, socialists, and anarchists separated to form this more secular organization.

Although the WRL was opposed to US participation in World War II, it did not protest against it; the WRL complied with the Espionage Act, ceased public protests, and did not solicit new members during this period. During World War II, many members were labeled conscientious objectors. In the 1950s, WRL members worked in the civil rights movement and organized protests against nuclear weapons testing and civil defense drills.

In the 1960s, WRL was the first pacifist organization to call for an end to the Vietnam War. WRL also organized the first demonstration against the war with a September 21, 1963 vigil at the U.S. Mission to the UN, followed by an October 9, 1963 picket of Madame Ngo Dinh Nhu speaking at the Waldorf-Astoria in New York City. WRL was among the primary groups (along with Committee for Nonviolent Action, the Fellowship of Reconciliation, the Socialist Party, and the Student Peace Union) to organize coordinated nationwide protests against the Vietnam War on December 19, 1964.

The organization's opposition to nuclear weapons was extended to include nuclear power in the 1970s and 1980s. The WRL has also been active in feminist and anti-racist causes and works with other organizations to reduce the level of violence in modern culture.

Current activities
Presently, the War Resisters League is actively organizing against the wars in Iraq and Afghanistan as well as the impact of war at home. Much of its organizing is focused on challenging military recruiters and ending corporate profit from war. It publishes an annual peace calendar, the quarterly magazine WIN: Through Revolutionary Nonviolence, and other materials and is involved in a number of national peace and justice coalitions, including United for Peace and Justice and the National War Tax Resistance Coordinating Committee. Since 1958, WRL has awarded almost annually the War Resisters League Peace Award to a person or organization whose work represents the League's radical nonviolent program of action.

The War Resisters League annually publishes a pie chart showing how much of the U.S. federal budget actually covers current and past military expenses, listing the total as 54%:
"The figures are federal funds, which do not include trust funds [emphasis added] — such as Social Security — that are raised and spent separately from income taxes....The government practice of combining trust and federal funds began during the Vietnam War, thus making the human needs portion of the budget seem larger and the military portion smaller. "

Using the larger total spending that includes trust funds, official government figures produce smaller percentages for military spending:  
"[Dov S. Zakheim, the Pentagon comptroller pointed] out that the 2004 military budget would represent 16.6 percent of all federal spending [emphasis added], compared with 27.3 percent in the late 1980s."

Key members

 Sidney Aberman
 Devere Allen
 Norma Becker
 Frida Berrigan
 Albert Bigelow
 Karl Bissinger
 Elinor Byrns
 Maris Cakars
 Mandy Carter
 Sybil Claiborne
 Winston Dancis
 Dave Dellinger
 Barbara Deming
 Ralph DiGia
 Julius Eichel
 Joe Felmet
 Henry Leroy Finch Jr.
 Larry Gara
 Sidney E. Goldstein
 Walter Gormly
 Edward P. Gottlieb
 Richard Gregg
 G. Simon Harak
 George W. Hartmann
 Ammon Hennacy
 Nat Hentoff
 Scott Herrick
 Isidor B. Hoffman
 John Haynes Holmes
 George Houser
 Evelyn West Hughan
 Jessie Wallace Hughan
 Bert Kanegson
 Abe Kaufman
 Randy Kehler
 Roy Kepler
 Steve Ladd
 Frieda Langer Lazarus
 Bradford Lyttle
 Ruth MacAdam
 Dwight Macdonald
 David McReynolds
 Mary S. McDowell
 A.J. Muste
 Tracy Dickinson Mygatt
 Frank Olmstead (pacifist)
 James Otsuka
 Grace Paley
 James Peck
 Orlie Pell
 Frances Rose Ransom
 Earle L. Reynolds
 Ruth Mary Reynolds
 Edward (Ned) Richards
 Igal Roodenko
 Vicki Rovere
 Bayard Rustin
 Ira Sandperl
 Lawrence Scott (Quaker)
 Joanne Sheehan
 Craig Simpson
 Upton Sinclair
 Ernest Allyn Smith
 William Sutherland
 Arlo Tatum
 Evan W. Thomas (pacifist)
 Carmen Trotta
 Jay Nelson Tuck
 Anna Strunsky Walling
 George Willoughby
 Lillian Willoughby
 Frances M. Witherspoon
 Irma Zigas

See also
 Military budget and total US federal spending
 List of anti-war organizations
 List of peace activists
 Pacifism
 People's Freedom Union
 War resister
 War Resisters' International

Footnotes

Further reading
 Bennett, Scott H.  Radical Pacifism: The War Resisters League and Gandhian Nonviolence in America, 1915-1963 NY: Syracuse Univ. Press, 2003.

External links
 War Resisters League website
 War Resisters Support Campaign – an effort to let US soldiers stay in Canada so they do not have to fight in Iraq or go to prison
 WIN Magazine archives in Swarthmore digital collections

1923 establishments in the United States
Anti-nuclear organizations based in the United States
Organizations established in 1923
Peace organizations based in the United States